Pyrenula microcarpa is a species of corticolous (bark-dwelling), crustose lichen in the family Pyrenulaceae.  It has a pantropical distribution.  The lichen was formally described as a new species in 1885 by Johannes Müller Argoviensis. It has a white to grey-coloured thallus with ascomata measuring up to 0.7 mm in diameter.

See also
List of Pyrenula species

References

microcarpa
Lichens described in 1885
Lichens of North America
Lichens of South America
Taxa named by Johannes Müller Argoviensis
Lichen species